The Dead Sea (Yam hamMelaḥ; , Āl-Baḥrū l-Maytū), also known by other names, is a salt lake bordered by Jordan to the east and the West Bank and Israel to the west. It lies in the Jordan Rift Valley, and its main tributary is the Jordan River.

With a salinity of 342 g/kg, or 34.2% (in 2011), it is one of the world's saltiest bodies of water – 9.6 times as salty as the ocean – and has a density of 1.24 kg/litre, which makes swimming similar to floating. This salinity makes for a harsh environment in which plants and animals cannot flourish, hence its name.

The Dead Sea has attracted visitors from around the Mediterranean Basin for thousands of years. It was one of the world's first health resorts (for Herod the Great), and it has been the supplier of a wide variety of products, from asphalt for Egyptian mummification to potash for fertilisers. Today, tourists visit the sea on its Israeli, Jordanian and West Bank coastlines. The Palestinian tourism industry has been met with setbacks in developing along the West Bank coast.

Multiple canal and pipeline proposals, such as the scrapped Red Sea–Dead Sea Water Conveyance project, have been made to reduce its recession.

Names
The name also occasionally appears in Hebrew literature as Yām HaMāvet, "Sea of Death".

Geography

The Dead Sea is an endorheic lake located in the Jordan Rift Valley, a geographic feature formed by the Dead Sea Transform (DST). This left lateral-moving transform fault lies along the tectonic plate boundary between the African Plate and the Arabian Plate. It runs between the East Anatolian Fault zone in Turkey and the northern end of the Red Sea Rift offshore of the southern tip of Sinai. It is here that the Upper Jordan River/Sea of Galilee/Lower Jordan River water system comes to an end.

The Jordan River is the only major water source flowing into the Dead Sea, although there are small perennial springs under and around the Dead Sea, forming pools and quicksand pits along the edges. There are no outlet streams.

The Mujib River, biblical Arnon, is one of the larger water sources of the Dead Sea other than the Jordan. Other more substantial sources are Wadi Darajeh (Arabic)/Nahal Dragot (Hebrew), and  that ends at Ein Gedi. Wadi Hasa (biblical Zered) is another wadi flowing into the Dead Sea.

The Dead Sea zone's aridity is due to the rainshadow effect of the Judaean Mountains. The highlands east of the Dead Sea receive more rainfall than the Dead Sea itself.

To the west of the Dead Sea, the Judaean mountains rise less steeply and are much lower than the mountains to the east.

Geology

Formation theories
There are two contending hypotheses about the origin of the low elevation of the Dead Sea. The older hypothesis is that the Dead Sea lies in a true rift zone, an extension of the Red Sea Rift, or even of the Great Rift Valley of eastern Africa. A more recent hypothesis is that the Dead Sea basin is a consequence of a "step-over" discontinuity along the Dead Sea Transform, creating an extension of the crust with consequent subsidence.

Sedom Lagoon
During the late Pliocene-early Pleistocene, around 3.7 million years ago, what is now the valley of the Jordan River, Dead Sea, and the northern Wadi Arabah was repeatedly inundated by waters from the Mediterranean Sea. The waters formed in a narrow, crooked bay that is called by geologists the Sedom Lagoon, which was connected to the sea through what is now the Jezreel Valley. The floods of the valley came and went depending on long-scale changes in the tectonic and climatic conditions.

The Hula Depression was never part of any of these water bodies due to its higher elevation and the high threshold of the Korazim block separating it from the Sea of Galilee basin.

Salt deposits

Lake formation
Approximately two million years ago, the land between the Rift Valley and the Mediterranean Sea rose to such an extent that the ocean could no longer flood the area. Thus, the long lagoon became a landlocked lake.

The first prehistoric lake to follow the Sedom Lagoon is named Lake Amora (which possibly appeared in the early Pleistocene; its sediments developed into the Amora (Samra) Formation, dated to over 200–80 kyr BP), followed by Lake Lisan (c. 70–14 kyr) and finally by the Dead Sea.

Lake salinity
The water levels and salinity of the successive lakes (Amora, Lisan, Dead Sea) have either risen or fallen as an effect of the tectonic dropping of the valley bottom, and due to climate variation. As the climate became more arid, Lake Lisan finally shrank and became saltier, leaving the Dead Sea as its last remainder.

Its level fluctuated dramatically, rising to its highest level around 26,000 years ago, indicating a very wet climate in the Near East. Around 10,000 years ago, the lake's level dropped dramatically, probably  even lower than today. Current theories as to the cause of this dramatic drop in levels rule out volcanic activity; therefore, it may have been a seismic event.

Salt mounts formation
In prehistoric times, great amounts of sediment collected on the floor of Lake Amora. The sediment was heavier than the salt deposits and squeezed the salt deposits upwards into what are now the Lisan Peninsula and Mount Sodom (on the southwest side of the lake). Geologists explain the effect in terms of a bucket of mud into which a large flat stone is placed, forcing the mud to creep up the sides of the bucket. When the floor of the Dead Sea dropped further due to tectonic forces, the salt mounts of Lisan and Mount Sodom stayed in place as high cliffs (see salt dome).

Climate
The Dead Sea has a hot desert climate (Köppen climate classification BWh), with year-round sunny skies and dry air. The region has weaker ultraviolet radiation, particularly the UVB (erythrogenic rays). Given the higher atmospheric pressure, the air has a slightly higher oxygen content (3.3% in summer to 4.8% in winter) as compared to oxygen concentration at sea level. Barometric pressures at the Dead Sea were measured between 1061 and 1065 hPa and clinically compared with health effects at higher altitude. (This barometric measure is about 5% higher than sea level standard atmospheric pressure of 1013.25 hPa, which is the global ocean mean or ATM.) The Dead Sea affects temperatures nearby because of the moderating effect a large body of water has on climate. During the winter, sea temperatures tend to be higher than land temperatures, and vice versa during the summer months. This is the result of the water's mass and specific heat capacity. On average, there are 192 days above  annually.

Chemistry

With 34.2% salinity (in 2011), it is one of the world's saltiest bodies of water, though Lake Vanda in Antarctica (35%), Lake Assal in Djibouti (34.8%), Lagoon Garabogazköl in the Caspian Sea (up to 35%) and some hypersaline ponds and lakes of the McMurdo Dry Valleys in Antarctica (such as Don Juan Pond (44%)) have reported higher salinities.

In the 19th century and the early 20th century, the surface layers of the Dead Sea were less salty than today, which resulted in an average density in the range of 1.15-1.17 g/cm3 instead of the present value of around 1.25 g/cm3. A sample tested by Bernays in the 19th century had a salinity of 19%. By the year 1926, the salinity had increased (although it was also suspected that the salinity varies seasonally and depends on the distance from the mouth of the Jordan).

Until the winter of 1978–79, when a major mixing event took place, the Dead Sea was composed of two stratified layers of water that differed in temperature, density, age, and salinity. Underneath a zone of transition, the lowest level of the Dead Sea had waters of a consistent  temperature, salinity of over 34%, and complete saturation of sodium chloride (NaCl). Since the water near the bottom is saturated with NaCl, that salt precipitates out of solution onto the sea floor.

Beginning in the 1960s, water inflow to the Dead Sea from the Jordan River was reduced as a result of large-scale irrigation and generally low rainfall. By 1975, the upper water layer was saltier than the lower layer. Nevertheless, the upper layer remained suspended above the lower layer because its waters were warmer and thus less dense. When the upper layer cooled so its density was greater than the lower layer, the waters mixed (1978–79). For the first time in centuries, the lake was a homogeneous body of water. Since then, stratification has begun to redevelop.

The mineral content of the Dead Sea is very different from that of ocean water. The exact composition of the Dead Sea water varies mainly with season, depth and temperature. In the early 1980s, the concentration of ionic species (in g/kg) of Dead Sea surface water was Cl− (181.4), Br− (4.2), SO42− (0.4), HCO3− (0.2), Ca2+ (14.1), Na+ (32.5), K+ (6.2) and Mg2+ (35.2). The total salinity was 276 g/kg. These results show that the composition of the salt, as anhydrous chlorides on a weight percentage basis, was calcium chloride (CaCl2) 14.4%, potassium chloride (KCl) 4.4%, magnesium chloride (MgCl2) 50.8% and sodium chloride (NaCl) 30.4%. In comparison, the salt in the water of most oceans and seas is approximately 85% sodium chloride. The concentration of sulfate ions (SO42−) is very low, and the concentration of bromide ions (Br−) is the highest of all waters on Earth.

The salt concentration of the Dead Sea fluctuates around 31.5%. This is unusually high and results in a nominal density of 1.24 kg/L. Anyone can easily float in the Dead Sea because of natural buoyancy. In this respect the Dead Sea is similar to the Great Salt Lake in Utah in the United States.

An unusual feature of the Dead Sea is its discharge of asphalt. From deep seeps, the Dead Sea constantly spits up small pebbles and blocks of the black substance. Asphalt-coated figurines and bitumen-coated Neolithic skulls from archaeological sites have been found. Egyptian mummification processes used asphalt imported from the Dead Sea region.

Putative therapies

The Dead Sea area has become a location for health research and potential treatment for several reasons. The mineral content of the water, the low content of pollens and other allergens in the atmosphere, the reduced ultraviolet component of solar radiation, and the higher atmospheric pressure at this great depth each may have specific health effects. For example, persons experiencing reduced respiratory function from diseases such as cystic fibrosis seem to benefit from the increased atmospheric pressure.

The region's climate and low elevation have made it a popular center for assessment of putative therapies:
Climatotherapy: Treatment which exploits local climatic features such as temperature, humidity, sunshine, barometric pressure and special atmospheric constituents
Heliotherapy: Treatment that exploits the biological effects of the sun's radiation
Thalassotherapy: Treatment that exploits bathing in Dead Sea water

Climatotherapy at the Dead Sea may be a therapy for psoriasis by sunbathing for long periods in the area due to its position below sea level and subsequent result that UV rays are partially blocked by the increased thickness of the atmosphere over the Dead Sea.

Rhinosinusitis patients receiving Dead Sea saline nasal irrigation exhibited improved symptom relief compared to standard hypertonic saline spray in one study.

Dead Sea mud pack therapy has been suggested to temporarily relieve pain in patients with osteoarthritis of the knees. According to researchers of the Ben Gurion University of the Negev, treatment with mineral-rich mud compresses can be used to augment conventional medical therapy.

Life forms

In the water
The sea is called "dead" because its high salinity prevents macroscopic aquatic organisms, such as fish and aquatic plants, from living in it, though minuscule quantities of bacteria and microbial fungi are present.

In times of flood, the salt content of the Dead Sea can drop from its usual 35% to 30% or lower. The Dead Sea temporarily comes to life in the wake of rainy winters. In 1980, after one such rainy winter, the normally dark blue Dead Sea turned red. Researchers from Hebrew University of Jerusalem found the Dead Sea to be teeming with an alga called Dunaliella. Dunaliella in turn nourished carotenoid-containing (red-pigmented) halobacteria, whose presence caused the color change. Since 1980, the Dead Sea basin has been dry and the algae and the bacteria have not returned in measurable numbers.

In 2011 a group of scientists from Be'er Sheva, Israel and Germany discovered fissures in the floor of the Dead Sea by scuba diving and observing the surface. These fissures allow fresh and brackish water to enter the Dead Sea. They sampled biofilms surrounding the fissures and discovered numerous species of bacteria and archaea.

Fauna and flora around the lake
Many animal species live in the mountains surrounding the Dead Sea. Hikers can see ibex, hares, hyraxes, jackals, foxes, and even leopards. Hundreds of bird species inhabit the zone as well. Both Jordan and Israel have established nature reserves around the Dead Sea.

History
The delta of the Jordan River was formerly a jungle of papyrus and palm trees. The Jewish historian Flavius Josephus described Jericho as "the most fertile spot in Judea". In Roman and Byzantine times, sugarcane, henna, and sycamore fig all made the lower Jordan valley wealthy. One of the most valuable products produced by Jericho was the sap of the balsam tree, which could be made into perfume. By the 19th century, Jericho's fertility had disappeared.

Human settlement
There are several small communities near the Dead Sea. These include Ein Gedi, Neve Zohar and the Israeli settlements in the Megilot Regional Council: Kalya, Mitzpe Shalem and Avnat. There is a nature preserve at Ein Gedi, and several Dead Sea hotels are located on the southwest end at Ein Bokek near Neve Zohar.

Potash City is a small community on the Jordanian side of the Dead Sea, and others including Suweima. Highway 65 runs north–south on the Jordanian side from near Jordan's northern tip down past the Dead Sea to the port of Aqaba.

Human history

Biblical period

Dwelling in caves near the Dead Sea is recorded in the Hebrew Bible as having taken place before the Israelites came to Canaan, and extensively at the time of King David.

Just northwest of the Dead Sea is Jericho. Somewhere, perhaps on the southeastern shore, would be the cities mentioned in the Book of Genesis which were said to have been destroyed in the time of Abraham: Sodom and Gomorrah (Genesis 18) and the three other "Cities of the Plain", Admah, Zeboim and Zoar (Deuteronomy 29:23). Zoar escaped destruction when Abraham's nephew Lot escaped to Zoar from Sodom (Genesis 19:21–22). Before the destruction, the Dead Sea was a valley full of natural tar pits, which was called the vale of Siddim. King David was said to have hidden from Saul at Ein Gedi nearby.

In Ezekiel 47:8–9 there is a specific prophecy that the sea will "be healed and made fresh", becoming a normal lake capable of supporting marine life. A similar prophecy is stated in Zechariah 14:8, which says that "living waters will go out from Jerusalem, half of them to the eastern sea [likely the Dead Sea] and half to the western sea [the Mediterranean]."

Greek and Roman period
Aristotle wrote about the remarkable waters around c.340 BC. The Nabateans and others discovered the value of the globs of natural asphalt that constantly floated to the surface where they could be harvested with nets. The Egyptians were steady customers, as they used asphalt in the embalming process that created mummies. The Ancient Romans knew the Dead Sea as "Palus Asphaltites" (Asphalt Lake).

The Dead Sea was an important trade route with ships carrying salt, asphalt and agricultural produce. Multiple anchorages existed on both sides of the sea, including in Ein Gedi, Khirbet Mazin (where the ruins of a Hasmonean-era dry dock are located), Numeira and near Masada.

King Herod the Great built or rebuilt several fortresses and palaces on the western bank of the Dead Sea. The most famous was Masada, where in 70 CE a small group of Jewish zealots fled after the fall of the destruction of the Second Temple. The zealots survived until 73 CE, when a siege by the X Legion ended in the deaths by suicide of its 960 inhabitants. Another historically important fortress was Machaerus (מכוור), on the eastern bank, where, according to Josephus, John the Baptist was imprisoned by Herod Antipas and died.

Also in Roman times, some Essenes settled on the Dead Sea's western shore; Pliny the Elder identifies their location with the words, "on the west side of the Dead Sea, away from the coast ... [above] the town of Engeda" (Natural History, Bk 5.73); and it is therefore a hugely popular but contested hypothesis today, that same Essenes are identical with the settlers at Qumran and that "the Dead Sea Scrolls" discovered during the 20th century in the nearby caves had been their own library.

Josephus identified the Dead Sea in geographic proximity to the ancient Biblical city of Sodom. However, he referred to the lake by its Greek name, Asphaltites.

Various sects of Jews settled in caves overlooking the Dead Sea. The best known of these are the Essenes of Qumran, who left an extensive library known as the Dead Sea Scrolls. The town of Ein Gedi, mentioned many times in the Mishna, produced persimmon for the temple's fragrance and for export, using a secret recipe. "Sodomite salt" was an essential mineral for the temple's holy incense, but was said to be dangerous for home use and could cause blindness. The Roman camps surrounding Masada were built by Jewish slaves receiving water from the towns around the lake. These towns had drinking water from the Ein Feshcha springs and other sweetwater springs in the vicinity.

Byzantine period
Intimately connected with the Judean wilderness to its northwest and west, the Dead Sea was a place of escape and refuge. The remoteness of the region attracted Greek Orthodox monks since the Byzantine era. Their monasteries, such as Saint George in Wadi Kelt and Mar Saba in the Judaean Desert, are places of pilgrimage.

Modern times

In the 19th century the River Jordan and the Dead Sea were explored by boat primarily by Christopher Costigan in 1835, Thomas Howard Molyneux in 1847, William Francis Lynch in 1848, and John MacGregor in 1869. The full text of W. F. Lynch's 1949 book Narrative of the United States' Expedition to the River Jordan and the Dead Sea is available online. Charles Leonard Irby and James Mangles travelled along the shores of the Dead Sea already in 1817–18, but didn't navigate on its waters.

Explorers and scientists arrived in the area to analyze the minerals and research the unique climate.

After the find of the "Moabite Stone" in 1868 on the plateau east of the Dead Sea, Moses Wilhelm Shapira and his partner Salim al-Khouri forged and sold a whole range of presumed "Moabite" antiquities, and in 1883 Shapira presented what is now known as the "Shapira Strips", a supposedly ancient scroll written on leather strips which he claimed had been found near the Dead Sea. The strips were declared to be forgeries and Shapira took his own life in disgrace.

They became known and famous as the Dead Sea Scrolls.

Tourism and leisure

British Mandate period
A golf course named for Sodom and Gomorrah was built by the British at Kalia on the northern shore.

Israel
The first major Israeli hotels were built in nearby Arad, and since the 1960s at the Ein Bokek resort complex.

Israel has 15 hotels along the Dead Sea shore, generating total revenues of $291 million in 2012. Most Israeli hotels and resorts on the Dead Sea are on a  stretch of the southern shore.

Jordan

On the Jordanian side, nine international franchises have opened seaside resort hotels near the King Hussein Bin Talal Convention Center, along with resort apartments, on the eastern shore of the Dead Sea. The 9 hotels have boosted the Jordanian side's capacity to 2,800 rooms.

On November 22, 2015, the Dead Sea panorama road was included along with 40 archaeological locations in Jordan, to become live on Google Street View.

West Bank
The World Bank estimates that such Dead Sea tourism industry could generate $290 million of revenues per year and 2,900 jobs. However, Palestinians have been unable to obtain construction permits for tourism-related investments on the Dead Sea. According to the World Bank, officials in the Palestinian Ministry of Tourism and Antiquities state that the only way to apply for such permits is through the Joint Committees established under the Oslo Agreement, but the relevant committee has not met with any degree of regularity since 2000.

Chemical industry

British Mandate period
In the early part of the 20th century, the Dead Sea began to attract interest from chemists who deduced the sea was a natural deposit of potash (potassium chloride) and bromine. A concession was granted by the British Mandatory government to the newly formed Palestine Potash Company in 1929. Its founder, Siberian Jewish engineer and pioneer of Lake Baikal exploitation, Moses Novomeysky, had worked for the charter for over ten years having first visited the area in 1911. The first plant, on the north shore of the Dead Sea at Kalya, commenced production in 1931 and produced potash by solar evaporation of the brine. Employing Arabs and Jews, it was an island of peace in turbulent times. The company quickly grew into the largest industrial site in the Middle East, and in 1934 built a second plant on the southwest shore, in the Mount Sodom area, south of the 'Lashon' region of the Dead Sea. Palestine Potash Company supplied half of Britain's potash during World War II. Both plants were destroyed by the Jordanians in the 1948 Arab–Israeli War.

Israel
The Dead Sea Works was founded in 1952 as a state-owned enterprise based on the remnants of the Palestine Potash Company. In 1995, the company was privatized and it is now owned by Israel Chemicals. From the Dead Sea brine, Israel produces (2001) 1.77 million tons potash, 206,000 tons elemental bromine, 44,900 tons caustic soda, 25,000 tons magnesium metal, and sodium chloride. Israeli companies generate around US$3 billion annually from the sale of Dead Sea minerals (primarily potash and bromine), and from other products that are derived from Dead Sea Minerals.

Jordan
On the Jordanian side of the Dead Sea, Arab Potash (APC), formed in 1956, produces 2.0 million tons of potash annually, as well as sodium chloride and bromine. The plant is located at Safi, South Aghwar Department, in the Karak Governorate.

Jordanian Dead Sea mineral industries generate about $1.2 billion in sales (equivalent to 4 percent of Jordan's GDP).

West Bank
The Palestinian economy is unable to benefit from Dead Sea chemicals due to restricted access, permit issues and the uncertainties of the investment climate. The World Bank estimates that a Palestinian Dead Sea chemicals industry could generate $918M incremental value added per year, "almost equivalent to the contribution of the entire manufacturing sector of Palestinian territories today".

Extraction
Both companies, Dead Sea Works Ltd. and Arab Potash, use extensive salt evaporation pans that have essentially diked the entire southern end of the Dead Sea for the purpose of producing carnallite, potassium magnesium chloride, which is then processed further to produce potassium chloride. The ponds are separated by a central dike that runs roughly north–south along the international border. The power plant on the Israeli side allows production of magnesium metal (by a subsidiary, Dead Sea Magnesium Ltd.).

Due to the popularity of the sea's therapeutic and healing properties, several companies have also shown interest in the manufacturing and supplying of Dead Sea salts as raw materials for body and skin care products.

Recession and environmental concerns

Receding shoreline
The Dead Sea has been rapidly shrinking since the 1960s because of diversion of incoming water from the Jordan River to the north as part of the National Water Carrier scheme, completed in 1964. The southern end is fed by a canal maintained by the Dead Sea Works, a company that converts the sea's raw materials. As the water level decreases, the characteristics of the Sea and surrounding region may substantially change.

The Dead Sea level drop has been followed by a groundwater level drop, causing brines that used to occupy underground layers near the shoreline to be flushed out by freshwater. This is believed to be the cause of the recent appearance of large sinkholes along the western shore—incoming freshwater dissolves salt layers, rapidly creating subsurface cavities that subsequently collapse to form these sinkholes.  Ein Gedi, on the western coast, has been subject to a large number of sinkholes appearing in the area, attributed to the decline in the water level of the Dead Sea.

, the surface of the Sea has shrunk by about 33 percent since the 1960s, which is partly attributed to the much-reduced flow of the Jordan River since the construction of the National Water Carrier project, and the amount of water from the rains reaching the Dead Sea has diminished even further since flash floods started pouring into the sinkholes.

Sources: Israel Oceanographic and Limnological Research, Haaretz, Jordan Valley Authority.

Link to the Red Sea

In May 2009 at the World Economic Forum, Jordan introduced plans for a "Jordan National Red Sea Development Project" (JRSP). This is a plan to convey seawater from the Red Sea near Aqaba to the Dead Sea. Water would be desalinated along the route to provide fresh water to Jordan, with the brine discharge sent to the Dead Sea for replenishment. Israel has expressed its support and will likely benefit from some of the water delivery to its Negev region.

At a regional conference in July 2009, officials expressed concern about the declining water levels. Some suggested industrial activities around the Dead Sea might need to be reduced. Others advised environmental measures to restore conditions such as increasing the volume of flow from the Jordan River to replenish the Dead Sea. Currently, only sewage and effluent from fish ponds run in the river's channel. Experts also stressed the need for strict conservation efforts. They said agriculture should not be expanded, sustainable support capabilities should be incorporated into the area and pollution sources should be reduced.

According to Jordan's minister for water, General Maysoun Zu'bi, this project could be considered as the first phase of the Red Sea–Dead Sea Water Conveyance.

In December 2013, Israel, Jordan and the Palestinian Authority signed an agreement for laying a water pipeline to link the Red Sea with the Dead Sea. In January 2015 it was reported that the level of water was dropping by  a year.

On 27 November 2016, the Jordanian government shortlisted five consortia to implement the project. Jordan's ministry of Water and Irrigation said that the $100 million first phase of the project would begin construction in the first quarter of 2018, and would be completed by 2021. The project was officially abandoned in June 2021, having never broken ground.

See also

Aral Sea
List of drying lakes
List of places on land with elevations below sea level
Mediterranean–Dead Sea Canal
Benjamin Elazari Volcani
PEF rock with the Dead Sea level reference line used between 1900 and 1913

References

Further reading
The World Bank, 2013, "The Red Sea - Dead Sea Water Conveyance Study Program", and source of basic data on the Dead Sea.
Yehouda Enzel, et al., eds (2006) New Frontiers in Dead Sea Paleoenvironmental Research, Geological Society of America, 
Niemi, Tina M., Ben-Avraham, Z., and Gat, J., eds., 1997, The Dead Sea: The Lake and Its Setting: N.Y., Oxford University Press, 286 p.
 World Bank, Poverty Reduction and Economic Management Department, Area C and the Future of the Palestinian Economy, October 2, 2013

External links
 
  (Israeli and West Bank part and Jordanian part)
 

 
Endorheic lakes of Asia
Extreme points of Earth
Lowest points
Bodies of water of Jordan
Lakes of Israel
Catholic pilgrimage sites
Sacred lakes
Shrunken lakes
Hebrew Bible geography
Lakes of the West Bank
Saline lakes of Asia
Israel–Jordan border
Borders of the West Bank
International lakes of Asia
Articles containing video clips